Sean Holmes may refer to:

 Sean Holmes (theatre director)
 Sean Holmes (surfer)